The Congaree River is a short but wide river in South Carolina in the United States; It flows for approximately 53 miles (85 km). The river serves an important role as the final outlet channel for the entire Lower Saluda and Lower Broad watersheds, before merging with the Wateree River just north of Lake Marion to form the Santee River.

It is formed in Columbia by the confluence of the Saluda and Broad rivers near the Piedmont Fall Line. It serves as part of the boundary between Richland, Calhoun, and Lexington counties. The only cities near the river are Columbia on the east, and Cayce and West Columbia on the west.

Despite the vast bottomland swamp below Columbia, the Congaree is navigable along much of its length at high water by barge traffic. This travels upriver from the Port of Charleston (approximately 100 miles (167 km) away through the Santee-Cooper Lakes to within 5 miles (8 km) of the fall line.

The Congaree National Park, one of the main recreational attractions of the river, is located about halfway down the river's course. The 22,200-acre (90 km²) park contains some of the last remaining old growth bottomland hardwood forest in North America. Recreational opportunities include hiking, biking, bird watching, botanical interests, and canoeing.

The river was named for the Congaree Native Americans who used to live along it.

Crossings
Below is a list of crossings from the river's origin in Columbia downstream to its confluence with the Wateree, where it forms the Santee River:

Columbia/West Columbia/Cayce
Jarvis Klapman Blvd (SC 12)
Gervais Street Bridge (U.S. 1/U.S. 378)
Blossom Street Bridge (U.S. 21/U.S. 321)
Granby/Olympia Mills railroad trestles
Interstate 77/Southeastern Beltway, Gills Creek forms near the I-77 Bridge  
Eastover
railroad trestle near confluence
McCords Ferry Road (U.S. 601), connecting Eastover and Saint Matthews

See also
List of South Carolina rivers

External links
Congaree National Park
South Carolina Dept. of Natural Resources
South Carolina DHEC
The River Alliance: Congaree River
Congaree Indians – Native Americans in SC

Geography of Columbia, South Carolina
Rivers of South Carolina
Rivers of Richland County, South Carolina
Rivers of Lexington County, South Carolina
Rivers of Calhoun County, South Carolina
Tributaries of the Santee River